Ayman Yahya Salem Ahmed, commonly known as Ayman Yahya (born 14 May 2001 in Saudi Arabia) is a Saudi professional footballer of Yemeni origin who currently plays for Al-Nassr as a winger.

Personal life
He was born from a Yemeni family in Riyadh. His older brother, Ali Yahya, is also a professional who plays for Al-Riyadh on loan from Al-Nassr.

Career

Al-Nassr FC
Climbed to the first team in the 2019–2020 season and participated in the first match in Saudi Professional League against the team Al-Hazem ended the match with a 1-1

Career Statistics

Club
As of 30 May 2021

Honours
Al-Nassr
 Saudi Super Cup: 2020

Saudi Arabia U23
AFC U-23 Asian Cup: 2022

Individual
 AFC U-23 Asian Cup Most Valuable Player: 2022

References

External links

2001 births
Living people
Sportspeople from Riyadh
Association football wingers
Saudi Arabian footballers
Saudi Arabia youth international footballers
Saudi Arabia international footballers
Al Nassr FC players
Al-Ahli Saudi FC players
Saudi Professional League players
Saudi Arabian people of Yemeni descent
Olympic footballers of Saudi Arabia
Footballers at the 2020 Summer Olympics